Alexander Saidgereyevich Galimov (2 May 1985 – 12 September 2011) was a Russian professional ice hockey player. At the time of his death, he was a member of Lokomotiv Yaroslavl of the Kontinental Hockey League (KHL)  whose team plane crashed on 7 September 2011 killing all but one of the 45 crew and passengers on board.

Playing career
Alexander Galimov was born in 1985 in Yaroslavl, then the Soviet Union. He began his professional career in 2004 with Lokomotiv Yaroslavl. The 6-foot, 196-pounder, played 341 RSL/KHL games, scoring 64 goals and 126 points, while racking up 280 penalty minutes.

Galimov was a member of the silver-medal winning Russian U20 team at the 2005 World Junior Ice Hockey Championships. He also played for the Russia men's national ice hockey team on the 2009–10 and 2010–11 Euro Hockey Tours.

Death

On 7 September 2011, a Yakovlev Yak-42 passenger aircraft, carrying nearly the entire Lokomotiv Yaroslavl team including Galimov, crashed just outside Yaroslavl, Russia. The team was traveling to Minsk to play their opening game of the season, with its coaching staff and prospects. Galimov was the only player from the team's roster who was on the plane to survive the initial impact. A crew member, Alexander Sizov, also survived.

Galimov suffered burns to over 80 percent of his body. The medical team in Yaroslavl managed to stabilize him, and on the following day, 8 September, he was transported to the Vishnevsky Institute of Surgery of the Russian Academy of Medical Sciences, where he was placed in a medically induced coma, and on artificial ventilation.

On 12 September 2011, Galimov died from the burns he had sustained in the crash five days earlier. Lokomotiv Yaroslavl marketing manager Yevgeni Chuev said it was likely that another memorial, this time specifically for Galimov, would be held on 13 September 2011.

Career statistics

Regular season and playoffs

International

See also

List of ice hockey players who died during their playing career

References

External links

1985 births
2011 deaths
Lokomotiv Yaroslavl players
Sportspeople from Yaroslavl
Russian ice hockey right wingers
Victims of the Lokomotiv Yaroslavl plane crash